V 108 Porjus was a German cargo ship that was converted into a Vorpostenboot for the Kriegsmarine during World War II. After the war, she returned to civilian service as a cargo ship in Greece, being known by the names Alkimini, Vassilakis and finally Mona. The ship was wrecked off Cheka on 27 November 1976.

Description
She was powered by a 4-stroke single cycle single acting diesel engine driving a single screw propeller. The engine had eight cylinders of  diameter by  stroke. It was rated at 179nhp and was built by Deutsche Werft, Kiel.

History
Porjus was built in 1937 by Lübecker Flenderwerke, Lübeck, Germany for the Afrikanische Frucht-Compagnie A.G., Hamburg. She was launched on 24 April. Porjus was operated under the management of Reederei F. Laeisz GmbH. Her port of registry was Hamburg and the Code Letters DJTM were allocated. On 1 October 1939, she was requsitioned by the Kriegsmarine for use as a Vorpostenboot. She served with 1 Vorpostenbootflottille as V-108 Porjus until December. She subsequently served as the minesweeper Sperrbrecher 38, later Sperrbrecher 133.

Post-war, Porjus was sold to Greece. She served under the names Alkimini, Vassilakis and Mona. She was wrecked off Cheka on 27 November 1976.

References

1937 ships
Merchant ships of Germany
Auxiliary ships of the Kriegsmarine
Cargo ships of Greece
Maritime incidents in 1976